Nemërçka Mountains are a mountain range in southern Albania between Përmet and Gjirokastër District, which extends from a northwest direction to the southeast near the border between Albania and Greece. Geologically, Nemërçkë is a limestone-flysch forming a massive anticline situated between the graben valley of Vjosë river. The mountain forms the southern section of the  Trebeshinë-Dhëmbel-Nemërçka mountain chain. To the north, Nemërçkë is separated from the Albanian Pindus mountains, by the Vjosë river. The mountains are characterized by steep cliffs and wooden mountain slopes. The eastern scarps falls on the Vjosë river, 2000 metres down.

Nemërçka falls within the Pindus Mountains mixed forests terrestrial ecoregion of the Palearctic temperate broadleaf and mixed forests biome. Its forests are renowned for housing European beech (Fagus sylvatica). It is the southernmost point where European beech can be found in Albania.

Maja e Papingut, (formerly ), is the highest peak within the mountain range. Other peaks in Nemërçkë includes Maja e Gatakut , Maja e Qesarit , and Maja e Poliçanit .

See also  

 Geography of Albania
 Mountains of Albania
 Southern Mountain Range

References 

 

Mountains of Albania
Geography of Gjirokastër County
Two-thousanders of Albania